Franklin D. Cooke Jr. (born July 21, 1958) is an American politician. He is a Democratic member of the Delaware House of Representatives, representing District 16. Cooke was elected in the general election on November 6, 2018, winning 85 percent of the vote over Republican candidate Albert Ament. Prior to his election, he was a police officer for New Castle County, where he was the first African-American mounted officer in the department.

References

External links
Official page at the Delaware General Assembly
Campaign site
 

1958 births
Living people
Democratic Party members of the Delaware House of Representatives
African-American state legislators in Delaware
People from New Castle County, Delaware
21st-century American politicians
21st-century African-American politicians
20th-century African-American people